Petre Cădariu was a Romanian footballer who played as a forward. He scored the only goal of the 1958 Cupa României final against Progresul București, which helped Politehnica Timișoara win the first trophy in the club's history. In 2008 Cădariu received the Honorary Citizen of Timișoara title.

International career
Petre Cădariu played one game at international level for Romania in a 1958 friendly against East Germany which ended with a 3–2 loss.

Honours
Politehnica Timișoara
Divizia B: 1952
Cupa României: 1957–58

Notes

References

External links
Labtof profile

Romanian footballers
Romania international footballers
Association football forwards
Liga I players
Liga II players
FC Politehnica Timișoara players
FCV Farul Constanța players
FC Dinamo București players